Christopher Rees (born 30 June 1965) is a former Welsh badminton player, who later works as national team coach and manager. He won the  boys' doubles title at the European Junior Champions in 1983 and the men's doubles bronze medalist at the European Championships in 1988. He competed at the 1986, 1990, and 1994 Commonwealth Games.

Rees has won 23 Welsh National Championships titles, achieved 130 caps for Wales, and reached a career-high as world number 12. After retired as badminton player, he went into coaching becoming Welsh national coach and manager, also part of Great Britain team coach at the 2000 Sydney Olympics.

Achievements

European Championships 
Men's doubles

European  Junior Championships 
Men's doubles

IBF World Grand Prix 
The World Badminton Grand Prix sanctioned by International Badminton Federation (IBF) since 1983.

Men's doubles

IBF International 
Men's singles

Men's doubles

Mixed doubles

References

External links 
 
 
 

1965 births
Living people
Welsh male badminton players
Badminton players at the 1986 Commonwealth Games
Badminton players at the 1990 Commonwealth Games
Badminton players at the 1994 Commonwealth Games
Commonwealth Games competitors for Wales
Badminton coaches